DCTS may refer to:

 Defence Centre of Training Support, a UK defence unit
 Dartmouth College Timesharing System, a renamed version of the DTSS computer operating system